Martin Dubreuil (born May 26, 1972) is a Canadian actor and musician from Quebec. He is most noted for his performance in the films 10½, for which he garnered a Genie Award nomination for Best Supporting Actor at the 31st Genie Awards, and Felix and Meira.

His other film roles have included February 15, 1839 (15 février 1839), 7 Days (Les 7 jours du talion), Before the Streets (Avant les rues), Hunting the Northern Godard (La Chasse au Godard d'Abbittibbi), L'Affaire Dumont, Shambles (Maudite poutine), The Great Darkened Days (La grande noirceur), For Those Who Don't Read Me (À tous ceux qui ne me lisent pas), Flashwood, Maria Chapdelaine, Heirdoms (Soumissions) and La Contemplation du mystère.

As a musician he was a member of the band Les Breastfeeders, in which he used the stage name "Johnny Maldoror".

References

External links

1972 births
Canadian male film actors
Canadian male television actors
Canadian indie rock musicians
Male actors from Montreal
Musicians from Montreal
Living people
Best Actor Jutra and Iris Award winners
21st-century Canadian male actors